Kovur is a village in Kandukur Mandal of Prakasam district, in the State of Andhra Pradesh, India. It is one of the large tobacco farming villages in the Kandukur region.

Geography
Kovur is located at  (15.216667, 79.91666).
Its surrounding Villages are Muppalla, Prakasam District, SingaraguntaBotlaPalem, Patha SingaraguntaBotlaPalem, Pandalapadu, Jillelamoodi, NarisettyvariPalem and YerraguntaPalem.

Demographics

As of the 2001 India census, Kovur had a population of 2,700. Males constitute 50.08% of the population and females 49.19%. The village has an average literacy rate of 41.5.The literacy rate of males in the village is 72% while that of females is 55%.

References

Villages in Prakasam district